Srishti Madurai was established on 2 September 2011 by Gopi Shankar Madurai as the first genderqueer and LGBT student volunteer group designed to target the problems of LGBT people in non-metro cities of Tamil Nadu.

In October 2011 Srishti Madurai launched India's first helpline for intersex, genderqueer, and LGBT people at Madurai. In June 2013 the helpline turned to offer service for 24 hours with a tagline "Just having someone understanding to talk to can save a life". Srishti Madurai also organized Asia's first Genderqueer Pride Parade at Madurai.

Srishti Madurai coined the regional Tamil terms for genderqueer people and published Maraikkappatta Pakkangal, the first book on gender-variants in Tamil.

On 22 April 2019 the Madras High Court (Madurai Bench) passed a landmark judgment and issued direction to ban sex-selective surgeries on intersex infants based on the works of Srishti Madurai. The Court took note of the rampant practice of compulsory sex reassignment surgeries performed on intersex infants and children.

The first ever state policy briefing on intersex human rights was organised in association with Intersex Asia Network, COC Netherlands and Ministry of Foreign Affairs in July 2019.

See also 
LGBT history in India
Tamil sexual minorities

References

LGBT student organizations
LGBT organisations in India